Fifteen Minutes That Shook the World is a film written by Dave Kirby about Liverpool F.C.'s Champions League win in 2005 in Istanbul, known as "The miracle of Istanbul". It stars Neil Fitzmaurice as Rafa Benítez and has cameos by Steven Gerrard, Jamie Carragher and Dietmar Hamann. The film has been available on DVD since late 2009.

The film begins with a TV journalist investigating the events of the Champions League final. He eventually tracks down CCTV footage of the Liverpool dressing room at half time.

The film had its world premiere on 16 November 2009 at the Odeon Cinema in Liverpool.

The film was made to raise money for Jamie Carragher's "23 Foundation" which is a Merseyside-based children's charity, and the cast were all volunteers.

Cast

Andrew Schofield as a journalist
Neil Fitzmaurice as Rafa Benítez
Jamie Carragher as himself - Liverpool F.C. Player
Steven Gerrard as himself - Liverpool F.C. Player
Dietmar Hamann as himself - Liverpool F.C. Player
Philly Carragher as himself
Lindzi Germain as Gwladys
Sean McKee as Bitter Blue
Marc J. Morrison as Ratboy (as ...Marc Morrison)
Sonny Spofforth as Ronaldo
David Gisbourne as Vladimír Šmicer
Michael Robinson as Milan Baroš
Daniel Sanderson as Igor Bišćan
Phil Connolly as Harry Kewell
Tom Doolan as John Arne Riise
Shawn "Spykatcha" John as Djibril Cissé

References

External links

2009 films
2004–05 UEFA Champions League
Liverpool F.C.
British association football films
Cultural depictions of British men
Cultural depictions of association football players
2000s English-language films
2000s British films